Aristide Simon Pierre Diedhiou (born 10 July 1991) is a Senegalese footballer. He plays as a striker and is currently playing for US Touarga in the Botola 2.

Career

Club
In March 2015, Diedhiou signed for Norwegian Tippeligaen side FK Haugesund on a four-year contract. On 4 January 2016, Diedhiou signed for Belgium Belgian Pro League side K.A.A. Gent.

Career statistics

Club

References

External links 
 
 Haugesund Profile

1991 births
Living people
Senegalese footballers
Diambars FC players
FK Haugesund players
K.A.A. Gent players
Oud-Heverlee Leuven players
Eliteserien players
Belgian Pro League players
Challenger Pro League players
Senegalese expatriate footballers
Expatriate footballers in Norway
Expatriate footballers in Belgium
Expatriate footballers in Morocco
Senegalese expatriate sportspeople in Norway
Senegalese expatriate sportspeople in Belgium
Senegalese expatriate sportspeople in Morocco
Association football forwards